Algazira Stadium, also spelled Al-Jazeera Stadium, is a multi-use stadium in Wad Madani, Sudan.  It is currently used mostly for football matches, on club level by Al-Ahli of the Sudan Premier League. The stadium has a capacity of 15,000 spectators.

References

Football venues in Sudan